The Van Diemen RF90, and its evolutions, the RF91 and the RF92, were open-wheel formula race car chassis, designed, developed and built by British manufacturer and race car constructor Van Diemen, for Formula Ford 1600 race categories, between 1990 and 1992.

References 

Open wheel racing cars
Formula Ford cars